Samuel Cockburn may refer to:

Samuel Cockburn of Templehall (died 1614), Scottish landowner and diplomat
Col. Samuel Cockburn (mercenary) (1574–1621), Scottish soldier who served in the Swedish army
Dr. Samuel Cockburn (physician) (1823–1915), outspoken Scottish advocate for homeopathy